Dawlatpur Degree College is a private college in Bangladesh. This college is known as Dawlatpur College. The college is affiliated to the Board of Intermediate and Secondary Education, Rajshahi and National University of Gazipur.

History 
The college was established by a few locals and the college was named Daulatpur Degree College after the village.

See also 
 Baniaganti S. N. Academy School And College

References

External links 
 Education Board Rajshahi 
 Education Boards of Bangladesh
 Directorate of Secondary and Higher Education in Bangladesh

Education in Sirajgonj